Zvezda-2005 Perm is a Russian professional women's football club currently competing in the Russian Women's Football Championship.

History
The club is based in the city of Perm and takes its name from men's team Zvezda Perm, which was dissolved in 1997. Zvezda-2005 won both the Russian league and national cup in 2007, and subsequently reached the final of the 2008-09 UEFA Women's Cup, losing to Duisburg.

They also won the Russian league in 2008 and 2009, making it three titles in a row. In 2010 they were third, failing to qualify to the Champions League.

Honours
Top Division
 Winners (6): 2007, 2008, 2009, 2014, 2015, 2017Russian Women's Cup
 Winners (7):  2007, 2012, 2013, 2015, 2016, 2018, 2019

European history

 All results (home and away) list Zvezda's goal tally first.

Squad

Source: Club website, UEFA

Former internationals

  Armenia: Kristine Aleksanyan
  Azerbaijan: Olga Vasilyeva
  Cameroon: Claudine Meffometou
  Ivory Coast: Josée Nahi
  Kazakhstan: Irina Saratovtseva
  Netherlands: Petra Hogewoning
  Nigeria: Ifeanyi Chiejine
  Russia: Natalia Barbashina, Maria Dyatchkova, Olesya Kurochkina, Tatyana Skotnikova, Valentina Savchenkova, Elena Suslova, Ksenia Tsybutovich
  South Africa: Busisiwe Ndimeni, Lena Mosebo
  Ukraine: Olha Boychenko, Vera Djatel, Hanna Kostraba, Olena Khodyreva, Alla Lyshafay, Ludmila Pekur, Natalia Zinchenko

Staff
 Head Coach:  Elena Suslova
 Youth Coach:  Olga Vasilyeva
 Goalkeeper Coach:  Maksim Chadov

See also
 FC Zvezda Perm

References

External links
 

Women's football clubs in Russia
Sports clubs in Perm, Russia
2005 establishments in Russia